Divine Fits was an American-Canadian indie rock band composed of Britt Daniel (Spoon), Dan Boeckner (Wolf Parade, Handsome Furs, Operators), Sam Brown, and Alex Fischel (Spoon). The group released their debut album, A Thing Called Divine Fits, in 2012 on Merge Records.

History
The group formed in late 2011, after Daniel and Boeckner discussed forming a band together. Their first public performances were in Austin, Texas, where they had a surprise showing before having their official debut.

Their first album, A Thing Called Divine Fits, was released August 28, 2012 via Merge Records.  It received positive reception from critics, with the Austinist and The Austin Chronicle praising the band. AllMusic scored it 4 out of 5 stars.

On November 16, 2012, the band made their television debut on Late Show with David Letterman.

On June 5, 2013, Divine Fits premiered two new singles, "Ain't That The Way" and "Chained to Love". on Conan. Jessica Dobson made an appearance with the band, playing guitar. The band's final show took place at The Parish in Austin, Texas on October 13, 2013. Daniel returned to performing with Spoon, with Fischel subsequently added as an official member on their next album They Want My Soul. Boeckner returned to Wolf Parade in 2016, while Brown formed the band Operators alongside Boeckner and Macedonian-American musician Devojka.

Members
Britt Daniel – vocals, guitar, bass, synthesizer, keyboards, piano, percussion, harmonizer
Dan Boeckner – vocals, guitar, synthesizer, bass
Sam Brown – drums, percussion
Alex Fischel – synthesizer, guitar, keyboards, piano, organ, celeste

Discography
A Thing Called Divine Fits (2012)

References

External links
Official website (Archived)

Indie rock musical groups from Texas
Musical groups established in 2012
Rock music supergroups
2012 establishments in Texas
Merge Records artists
Third Man Records artists